Jawan is a 2023 upcoming Indian Hindi-language action thriller film written and directed by Atlee. It stars Shah Rukh Khan in a dual role with Vijay Sethupathi, Nayanthara, Sanya Malhotra and Priyamani. The music is composed by Anirudh Ravichander.

Principal photography commenced in September 2021 and ended in February 2023 with filming taking place in Pune, Mumbai, Hyderabad, Chennai and Aurangabad. It is scheduled for theatrical release on 2 June 2023.

Cast
 Shah Rukh Khan 
 Vijay Sethupathi
 Nayanthara
 Priyamani
 Sanya Malhotra
 Sunil Grover
 Yogi Babu
 Riddhi Dogra
 Mansoor Ali Khan
 Astha Agarwal
 Vijay (cameo appearance)
 Sanjay Dutt (cameo appearance)
 Deepika Padukone (cameo appearance)

Production

Development
In late 2019, it was rumored that Shah Rukh Khan would team up with Tamil film director Atlee and the project was confirmed in 2020. In May 2021, it was reported that the filming would commence soon.

Casting
Nayanthara was finalized, thus marking her Hindi cinema debut. Priyamani, Sunil Grover, Sanya Malhotra and Yogi Babu later joined the cast. Babu joined with Khan after a decade, last he acted with Khan in Chennai Express. Rana Daggubati was offered the antagonist role but declined citing health issues and thus the role went to Vijay Sethupathi. Sanjay Dutt and Deepika Padukone make cameo appearances.

Filming
Principal photography commenced in September 2021 in Pune. The film was shot in Pune, Mumbai, Hyderabad, Chennai and Aurangabad.

Music
A. R. Rahman was reportedly approached by director Atlee to compose for the film. Rahman subsequently declined the offer for reasons unknown, and Anirudh Ravichander was chosen to compose for the film, who would thus mark his debut as a solo composer in Bollywood, previously having composed a song for David and the background score of Jersey. The music rights are bagged by T-Series.

Release
Jawan is set to be released on 2 June 2023 in Hindi. In addition, the film will be dubbed and released in Tamil, Telugu, Malayalam and Kannada languages.

References

External links 
 
  Jawan on Bollywood Hungama

2023 films
Upcoming Hindi-language films
2020s Hindi-language films
Films directed by Atlee (director)
Films scored by Anirudh Ravichander
Indian drama films